Rolla Hamilton Mapel (March 9, 1890 – April 6, 1966) was a Major League Baseball pitcher who played for the St. Louis Browns in .

External links

1890 births
1966 deaths
St. Louis Browns players
Major League Baseball pitchers
Baseball players from Missouri
Great Bend Millers players
Fort Worth Panthers players
Joplin Miners players
Kearney Kapitalists players
Louisville Colonels (minor league) players
McAlester Miners players
New Orleans Pelicans (baseball) players